Heavy Weather is the seventh album by Weather Report, released in 1977 through Columbia Records. The release originally sold about 500,000 copies; it would prove to be the band's most commercially successful album. Heavy Weather received a 5-star review from DownBeat magazine and went on to be voted jazz album of the year by the readers of that publication.  On this album the lineup consisted of Weather Report founders Joe Zawinul (keyboards, synthesizers) and Wayne Shorter (saxophone), alongside Jaco Pastorius (bass), Alex Acuña (drums), and Manolo Badrena (percussion).  It was produced and orchestrated by Zawinul, with additional production by Shorter and Pastorius, and engineered by Ron Malo.

Featuring the jazz standard "Birdland", the album is one of the best sellers in the Columbia jazz catalog. This opening track was a significant commercial success, something not typical of instrumental music. The melody had been performed live by the band as part of "Dr Honoris Causa", which was from Joe Zawinul's eponymous solo album.  "Teen Town", a Pastorius composition where his bass takes the lead instrument role, is often considered a highlight of the album and of Pastorius's career.  Although not mentioned as a live recording in the liner notes, "Rumba Mamá" (a percussion and vocals feature for Manolo Badrena and Alex Acuña) was recorded at a band's concert in Montreux, Switzerland during the summer of 1976, of which a film would be subsequently released on DVD in 2007.

Critical reception

Dan Oppenheimer said in a June 1977 review for Rolling Stone that he felt the band had moved away from their earlier music, losing a lot of the space, melodies and airy feel that set them apart from other jazz-rock bands, but gaining a new bassist who "has been instrumental in developing their busier, talkative style", and that while their music previously "went up and up only, becoming more ethereal as it went, the new bottom makes all the difference in the world".

Legacy

Richard Ginell commented in a retrospective review for Allmusic that it was released "just as the jazz-rock movement began to run out of steam", however he felt that "this landmark album proved that there was plenty of creative life left in the idiom."

In February 2011, Heavy Weather was inducted into the Grammy Hall of Fame.

The album was included in Robert Dimery's 1001 Albums You Must Hear Before You Die.

In 2000, it was voted #822 in Colin Larkin's All Time Top 1000 Albums.

The singer Bilal names it among his 25 favorite albums, citing the interplay between Jaco Pastorius and Joe Zawinul.

Track listing

Personnel

Weather Report
 Joe Zawinul – ARP 2600 on all tracks except "Rumba Mamá", Rhodes electric piano on all tracks except "Birdland", "Rumba Mamá", and "Havona", Yamaha grand piano on "Birdland", "Harlequin", "The Juggler", and "Havona", Oberheim polyphonic synthesizer on all tracks except "Rumba Mamá", "Palladíum", and "The Juggler", vocals on "Birdland", melodica on "Birdland" and "Teen Town", guitar and tabla on "The Juggler". 
 Wayne Shorter – Soprano saxophone on all tracks except "A Remark You Made" and "Rumba Mamá", tenor saxophone on "Birdland"", "A Remark You Made", and "Palladíum"
 Jaco Pastorius – Fretless bass on all tracks except "Rumba Mamá", mandocello on "Birdland" and "The Juggler", vocals on "Birdland", drums on "Teen Town", steel drums on "Palladíum"
 Alex Acuña – Drums on all tracks except "Teen Town" and "Rumba Mamá", congas and tom-toms on "Rumba Mamá", handclaps on "The Juggler"
 Manolo Badrena – Tambourine on "Birdland", congas on "Teen Town", "Rumba Mamá", and "Palladíum", vocals on "Harlequin" and "Rumba Mamá", timbales on "Rumba Mamá", percussion on "Palladíum" and "The Juggler"

Production
 Joe Zawinul – Record producer and orchestrator
 Jaco Pastorius – Co-producer
 Wayne Shorter – Assistant producer
 Ron Malo – Engineer
 Jerry Hudgins – Assistant engineer
 Brian Risner – Assistant engineer and chief meteorologist
 Frank Tozour – Sony reissue premastering
 Nancy Donald – Design
 Lou Beach – Illustration
 Keith Williamson – Photography

Charts

Weekly charts

Year-end charts

Release history
The album was first released in LP format worldwide throughout Columbia Records, CBS Records, Sony Records, and other minor record labels. In 1984, it was first released in CD format in the U.S. on Columbia Records. In 1992, the album was remastered, and, in 2002, published in Super Audio CD format.

See the table below for a more comprehensive list of the album releases.

References

External links 

 Weather Report Annotated Discography: Heavy Weather
 

1977 albums
Columbia Records albums
Weather Report albums